Victoria C. Willing (born 1959) is a British actress known for her work on The Inbetweeners and various Jim Henson Company productions. In January 2020, Willing appeared in an episode of the BBC soap opera Doctors as Gwen Hubbard, and in August 2020, she appeared in an episode of the BBC medical drama Casualty.

Early life 
In 1972, Willing was born in Marylebone, Central London to artist parents. She is the daughter of Dame Paula Rego and Victor Willing.

Personal life 
Willing has a daughter, Grace Smart, a set designer born in 1993, by the actor and comedian Andy Smart.

References

External links 
 

 

 Interview for The Stage

Living people
1959 births
British people of Portuguese descent
British voice actresses
Actresses from London
21st-century British dramatists and playwrights
People from Marylebone
21st-century English women
21st-century English people